"Do Not Resuscitate" is the 15th episode of the HBO original series The Sopranos and the second of the show's second season. Written by Robin Green, Mitchell Burgess, and Frank Renzulli, and directed by Martin Bruestle, it originally aired on January 23, 2000.

Starring
 James Gandolfini as Tony Soprano
 Lorraine Bracco as Dr. Jennifer Melfi *
 Edie Falco as Carmela Soprano
 Michael Imperioli as Christopher Moltisanti
 Dominic Chianese as Corrado Soprano, Jr.
 Vincent Pastore as Pussy Bonpensiero
 Steven Van Zandt as Silvio Dante
 Tony Sirico as Paulie Gualtieri
 Robert Iler as Anthony Soprano, Jr.
 Jamie-Lynn Sigler as Meadow Soprano
 Drea de Matteo as Adriana La Cerva *
 Aida Turturro as Janice Soprano
 Nancy Marchand as Livia Soprano

* = credit only

Guest starring

Synopsis
Jack Massarone's construction company, which provides no-show jobs to Tony, is being picketed by black protesters, led by Reverend  Herman James, Jr., demanding jobs for black workers. In return for payment by Massarone, Tony sends some thugs who brutally beat up the protesters. He and Reverend James are colluding, and they split the payment.

For the first time, Pussy is seen with his FBI handler, Skip Lipari. Skip is pressing for information, but Pussy stalls.

Tony visits Junior in jail. They argue: Junior tries to convince Tony that Livia had nothing to do with the hit on his life, and that he should make peace with her. Tony mocks him for being manipulated by Livia. Tony meets with Bobby "Bacala" Baccalieri, Junior's aide, and tells him that Junior will keep the title of boss, and will be permitted to "earn" on a "subsistence level"; the rest will be Tony's.  Junior's release from prison on medical grounds is obtained, but he is placed under house arrest with an ankle monitor. Junior conducts business at his doctor's office, which cannot be bugged. At an ostensible appointment there, Junior tells Tony that the owner of Livia's former nursing home, Freddie Capuano, has been gossiping about him, Livia, and Tony. Capuano disappears; a state trooper finds his abandoned Cadillac, with his toupée lying nearby.

Janice continues to visit her mother in the hospital. They antagonize each other, but when Janice plays the old music that Livia loves, they bond for the first time in years. Livia speaks of the money she has hidden; she doesn't remember where. Tony contemptuously tells Janice they deserve each other; she can live with Livia in Livia's house when she leaves the hospital. During a visit to his grandmother, A.J. innocently mentions DNR. Questioning him, she realizes that Janice and Tony are considering a DNR instruction for her.

One evening Junior slips in the shower and is badly hurt. He speaks of his guilt to Tony and again urges him to make peace with Livia. He will not accept an ambulance but allows Tony to carry him to his car and drive him to the emergency room.

First appearances
 "Black" Jack Massarone: owner of Massarone Brothers Construction, which was once run by Uncle Junior
 Bobby "Bacala" Baccalieri: a member of the Junior Soprano crew who becomes Junior's chief aide
 Agent Skip Lipari: FBI agent handling Big Pussy Bonpensiero
 Reverend James, Jr.: Christian minister, secret associate of Tony Soprano

Deceased
 Frederick "Freddie" Capuano: Director of Green Grove Retirement Community, presumed murdered by the DiMeo crime family for talking about Mafia business and about Tony's attempt to kill his mother, though his body is never shown on screen
 Reverend Herman James, Sr.: dies of natural causes due to old age (he was 83)

Title reference
 The episode's title is a common medical clause known as Do Not Resuscitate or DNR. Janice and Tony talk about signing a DNR for Livia.

Cultural references
 Janice quotes (slightly misquotes) from The Mourning Bride by William Congreve: "Music hath charms..."
 Bobby quotes (slightly misquotes) the words of Senator William L. Marcy: "To the victor belong the spoils."
 When Tony finally gives his begrudging approval for Janice to live with Livia in the latter's home, he says "It'll be like 'Whatever Happened to Baby Janice?' over there," likely referring to the Bette Davis/Joan Crawford film What Ever Happened to Baby Jane?

Production
 Although this was the second episode of Season 2 to air, it was the third to be produced.

References to other media
After Livia finds out about Janice's plans regarding the DNR (and that Janice will be moving in with her), she confronts her daughter, saying: "I've seen that movie with Richard Widmark." This is most likely a reference to the film Kiss of Death (1947), in which Widmark's character (a gleefully psychotic killer) pushes a wheelchair-using elderly woman down a flight of stairs to her death. This is reinforced by the fact that during this scene, Janice briefly hallucinates an image of Livia falling down the stairs on an "In case of fire use stairs" sign on the hospital wall. It may alternatively be seen as a reference to the 1978 film Coma, also starring Widmark.

Music
 The song playing as Janice drives home from the hospital while smoking marijuana is "Mother and Child Reunion," by Paul Simon.
 The song playing when Janice reconciles with Livia in the hospital is "Non ti scordar di me," sung by tenor Luciano Pavarotti.
 The song played over the end credits is "Goodnight, My Love" by Ella Fitzgerald and Benny Goodman.

Filming locations 
Listed in order of first appearance:

 Jersey City, New Jersey
 North Caldwell, New Jersey
 Montclair, New Jersey
 Wayne Towne Center in Wayne, New Jersey
 Satriale's Pork Store in Kearney, New Jersey
 Newark, New Jersey
 West Orange, New Jersey
 Beneath the New Jersey Turnpike along the Passaic River in the Meadowlands

References

External links
"Do Not Resuscitate"  at HBO

The Sopranos (season 2) episodes
2000 American television episodes

fr:Acharnement thérapeutique (Les Soprano)